Herbert Wiesinger (born 26 July 1948, in Jugenheim an der Bergstrasse) is a German former pair skater who competed for West Germany.

He partnered with Marianne Streifler until 1969. They were two-time German silver medalists and placed 11th at the 1968 Winter Olympics. The pair represented the Frankfurter REC club.

He teamed up with Almut Lehmann in 1970 and competed with her until retirement. They were three-time German national champions and won the bronze medal at the 1973 European Figure Skating Championships. They placed 5th at the 1972 Winter Olympics. They represented the club SC Rießersee.

He is currently the Skating Director at the Alpharetta Family Skate Center a.k.a. The Cooler in Alpharetta, Georgia in the United States.

Competitive highlights

With Almut Lehmann

With Marianne Streifler

References
 
 ISU statistics

1948 births
Living people
German male pair skaters
Figure skaters at the 1968 Winter Olympics
Figure skaters at the 1972 Winter Olympics
Olympic figure skaters of West Germany
European Figure Skating Championships medalists